The First Presbyterian Church, built in 1911, is a historic Carpenter Gothic-style Presbyterian church located in Lynn Haven. Bay County, Florida, USA.

In 1989, the First Presbyterian Church was listed as the Lynn Haven Presbyterian Church in A Guide to Florida's Historic Architecture, published by the University of Florida Press. The listing described the church building as an "interesting architectural study in scale and massing".

First Presbyterian is still an active church in the Presbytery of Florida. The Rev. Lisa Martin is the current pastor.

References

External links

Carpenter Gothic church buildings in Florida
Churches in Bay County, Florida
Presbyterian churches in Florida
1911 establishments in Florida
Churches completed in 1911